Papi or PAPI may refer to:

Places
 Papi District, an administrative subdivision of Iran
 Papı, a village in Azerbaijan
 Papi Hills, Andhra Pradesh, India

Arts and entertainment
 "Papi" (song), a 2011 song by Jennifer Lopez from Love?
 "Papi", a track from the album Straight Outta Oz by Todrick Hall
 Papi (The L Word character), a character in the TV series The L Word
 Papi (film), a 2018 Belgian-Ugandan-French film
 Papi, a character from the Japanese manga series Monster Musume
 Mr. Papi, a character in games by Sunflat Games

PAPI
 Performance Application Programming Interface in computer science
 Personality and Preference Inventory, a personality measure designed for the workplace
 Precision approach path indicator, a visual guidance system for aircraft pilots

Other uses
 Papi (name), including a list of people with the name
 Papi language, spoken in a single village in Papua New Guinea